The Héctor J. García Early College High School (formerly named Laredo Early College High School at Texas A&M International University) is located in Laredo, Texas. Its address is 5241 University Boulevard. It is one of the four high schools under the Laredo Independent School District. It was established in August 2006 and was first situated in portable buildings that shared grounds with Texas A&M International University. The first graduating class was the Class of 2010. In 2012, the portable buildings were replaced with a new edifice that is two stories tall with two sets of stairs and elevator accessibility on each floor. It has a student population of approximately 400 students. This school is currently ranked #72 in the nation by U.S. News & World Report.

Academics

Laredo Early College High School at TAMIU currently offers 3 AP courses: 
AP Calculus AB
AP Spanish Language & Culture
AP Spanish Literature & Culture

Most of the high school pupils in this school take pre-AP and college-level courses. This school is required to administer the STAAR EOCs to its students.

Extracurricular activities
University Interscholastic League (UIL)
National Honor Society 
Spanish Honor Society
Chess Club
Robotics Club
Yearbook Club
Student Council
Student Advisory
Student Health Advisory Council
Running Club
Zumba Club

Laredo Early College High School has participated in many UIL invitational meets as well as the regional and state meets; it probably became a full-fledged member in the 2010–2011 school year. The school currently has UIL coaches for Ready Writing, Social Studies, Science, Spelling & Vocabulary, Calculator Applications, Number Sense, Current Issues & Events, Cross Examination Debate, Mathematics, Young Filmmakers & Literary Criticism.

Science - 2016 5A District 29 top scorer in Chemistry & District runner-up
Ready Writing - two students placed first and third in 2014 Conference 4A District 31. This also occurred in the 2016 Conference 5A District 29.
Literary Criticism - 2014 4A District 31 runner-up in 2014 and 2016 5A District 29 champion
Calculator Applications - 2016 5A District 29 first-place team
Current Issues and Events- 2015 5A District 29 first-place team. In addition, one student placed second and first in the 2015 and 2016 5A District 29 meet, respectively.
Spelling & Vocabulary - 2014 4A District 31 runner-up
Cross Examination Debate - one team placed fourth in the 2016 5A Conference 29 district meet
Social Studies - 2014 4A District 31 runner-up & 2016 5A District 29 runner-up. 
In addition, the UIL Social Studies team was the first Wild Card team in 2014. In 2015, the team made another record in which two students placed third and sixth. In 2016, the team also made another record in which one student was the district champion and the other placed third; the team lost the district champion team title to San Antonio's Southside High School (back-to-back champions) by 7 points. Furthermore, one UIL Social Studies team member became the first student in his school to be a top six medalist in a region meet and qualify for the state meet in the 2016 Conference 5A Region 4 meet; he is also the first student to finish as a top six medalist in State.

See also
 Early entrance to college

References
http://earlycollege.elisd.org/

External links
 

Public high schools in Texas
High schools in Laredo, Texas